The Lyndon B. Johnson School of Public Affairs (or LBJ School of Public Affairs) is a graduate school at the University of Texas at Austin that was founded in 1970 to offer training in public policy analysis and administration for students that are very interested in pursuing careers in government and public affairs-related areas of the private and nonprofit sectors. Degree programs include a Master of Public Affairs (MPAff), a mid-career MPAff sequence, 16 MPAff dual degree programs, a Master of Global Policy Studies (MGPS), eight MGPS dual degree programs, an Executive Master of Public Leadership, and a Ph.D. in public policy. The LBJ School is currently ranked 7th among public affairs programs in 2022 by U.S. News & World Report, up from 8th in 2021.

Overview
The LBJ School offers a Master of Public Affairs program in public policy analysis and administration that prepares graduates to assume leadership positions in government, business, and non-profit organizations. In addition, 16 master's-level dual degree programs blend public affairs study with specialized professions or area studies and are structured so that students can earn the Master of Public Affairs degree and a second degree in less time than it would take to earn them separately." Program offerings include a traditional Master of Public Affairs program, a mid-career master's program, seventeen master's-level programs leading to dual degrees including: Advertising; Asian Studies; Business Administration; Communication Studies; Energy and Earth Resources; Engineering; Information Studies; Journalism; Latin American Studies; Law; Middle Eastern Studies; Public Health; Radio, Television, Film; Russian, East European, and Eurasian Studies; Social Work; and Women's and Gender Studies. The school also offers a Ph.D. in public policy. Master's students have the option to specialize in one of seven areas: international affairs; natural resources and the environment; nonprofit and philanthropic studies; public leadership and management; social and economic policy; technology, innovation, and information policy; or urban and state affairs. As of 2011-2012, the LBJ School has graduated 3,508 master's degree students since its first inaugural class of 1972, as well as 56 Ph.D. students from 1992 to August 2013.

In 2008, the LBJ School also introduced a Master of Global Policy Studies that offers a multidisciplinary approach to the complex economic, political, technological, and social issues of the 21st century. Program offerings include specializations in the areas of security, law and diplomacy; international trade and finance; development; global governance and international law; energy, environment, and technology; regional international policy, and customized specializations. Program offerings include ten dual degree programs with the following programs: Asian Studies; Business; Energy and Earth Resources; Information Studies; Journalism; Latin American Studies; Law; Middle Eastern Studies; Public Health; and Russian, East European, and Eurasian Studies.

The school also offers a Portfolio Program in Arts and Cultural Management and Entrepreneurship and a Portfolio Program in Nonprofit Studies.

The school also sponsors a variety of non-degree programs for public affairs professionals.

In 2013, the LBJ School launched a new Executive Master in Public Leadership for mid-career professionals, the first of its kind in Texas.

Mission
The school's goals are stated as to: Prepare students and professionals, from a variety of backgrounds, for leadership positions in public service by providing educational opportunities grounded in theory, ethics, analytical skills, and practice; Produce interdisciplinary research to advance our understanding of complex problems facing society and to seek creative solutions for addressing them; Promote effective public policy and management practice by maintaining a presence in scholarly and policy communities and in the popular media; and Foster civic engagement by providing a forum for reasoned discussion and debate on issues of public concern.

Centers 
The LBJ School of Public Affairs also features five research centers. Many of the School's centers also sponsor a range of other activities, including conferences, workshops, and publications.

Center for Politics and Governance 
The Center for Politics and Governance is dedicated to producing leaders and ideas to improve the political process and governance through innovative teaching, research and programming combining academics and the real world.

Ray Marshall Center for the Study of Human Resources 
The Ray Marshall Center is a university-based research center. The Center's activities and services include: Program evaluation, including process and implementation, impact and benefit/cost analysis; Survey research;Labor market analysis; Program design and development; Training and technical assistance.

Center for Health and Social Policy (CHASP) 
CHASP studies how health and social policy can be improved and designs and conducts research in policymaking and health, economic and social program outcomes.

RGK Center for Philanthropy and Community Service 
The Center's research addresses pressing issues in philanthropy, nonprofit management, social entrepreneurship, and global civil society. The Center trains students through a university-wide graduate program in nonprofit studies.

The Robert S. Strauss Center for International Security and Law

Student initiatives

The Great Society Fund was created by the class of 2005 to finance innovative social entrepreneurship projects started by LBJ students and alumni.

The Baines Report is the officially-sponsored student publication of the LBJ School of Public Affairs. Led by students, the Baines Report publishes student opinion pieces and event coverage for the LBJ School.

Commencement speakers 1972–2014
1972   Allen E. Pritchard, Jr., incoming Vice President, National League of Cities
1973   J. J. "Jake" Pickle, U.S. Congressman from Texas; member of the House Ways and Means Committee
1974   Richard W. Bolling, U.S. Congressman from Missouri; Chairman of the House Rules Committee
1975   Renell Parkins, Professor of Architecture and Planning, UT Austin
1976   Alice M. Rivlin, Director, Congressional Budget Office
1977   Kenneth E. Boulding, Distinguished Professor of Economics, University of Colorado at Boulder; 1976-77 Distinguished Visiting Tom Slick Professor of World Peace, LBJ School
1978   James C. Wright, Jr., U.S. Congressman from Texas (Majority Leader)
1979   Barbara Jordan, former U.S. Congresswoman from Texas; holder of the Lyndon B. Johnson Public Service Professorship, LBJ School
1980   Joseph Califano, Jr., former U.S. Secretary of Health, Education, and Welfare, Carter Administration; former Special Assistant to President Lyndon Johnson
1981   Walter E. Mondale, former Vice President of the United States
1982   Robert S. Strauss, former Special U.S. Representative for Trade Negotiations; former Chairman, Democratic National Committee
1983   Henry Cisneros, Mayor of San Antonio
1984   Alexander Heard, Chancellor Emeritus and Professor of Political Science, Vanderbilt University; Chairman of the Board, Ford Foundation
1985   Bill Moyers, editor, correspondent, and news analyst, CBS News; former Special Assistant to the President and Press Secretary to President Lyndon Johnson
1986   Gary Hart, U.S. Senator from Colorado
1987   James C. Wright, Jr., Speaker, U.S. House of Representatives
1988   Yvonne B. Burke, Director, Los Angeles Branch, Federal Reserve Bank; former U.S. Congresswoman from California
1989   Chase Untermeyer, White House Presidential Personnel Director, Bush Administration
1990   Corrado Pirzio-Biroli, Deputy Head of the European Community Delegation, Washington, D.C.
1991   Ann W. Richards, Governor of Texas
1992   William F. Winter, former Governor of Mississippi
1993   Richard D. Lamm, former Governor of Colorado
1994   William Greider, author and journalist
1995   Ellen Malcolm, founder and president, EMILY's List (resource for pro-choice Democratic women candidates)
1996   Ann W. Richards, former Governor of Texas
1997   Jack Rosenthal, Editor, New York Times Magazine
1998   Paul Begala, Staff Adviser to President Bill Clinton
1999   Kenneth S. Apfel, U.S. Commissioner of Social Security; LBJ School Class of 1978
2000   Judith A. Winston, Under Secretary and General Counsel, U.S. Department of Education; former Director, President Clinton's initiative on race
2001   James Carville, political strategist and consultant
2002   George H.W. Bush, 41st President of the United States
2003   Gwen Ifill, Moderator and Managing Editor, PBS Washington Week
2004 Liz Carpenter, Former Press Secretary for Lady Bird Johnson
2005 Don Evans, 34th Secretary of the U.S. Department of Commerce
2006 William Jefferson "Bill" Clinton, 42nd President of the United States
2007 Bob Schieffer, CBS News Washington 
2008 Vernon E. Jordan Jr., former president of the National Urban League 
2009 Bill Bradley, former U.S. Senator
2010 James B. Steinberg, Deputy Secretary of State, U.S. Department of State
2011 Kathleen A. Merrigan, Deputy Secretary of Agriculture. U.S. Department of Agriculture
2012 Bill Owens, Former Governor of Colorado
2013 Helene Gayle, CEO of CARE USA
2014 Julian Castro, Mayor of San Antonio
2021 Ibram X. Kendi

Rankings
The LBJ School is currently ranked 7th among public affairs programs in 2022 by U.S. News & World Report, up from 8th in 2021.

List of deans

 John A. Gronouski (September 1969 – September 1974)
 William B. Cannon (October 1974 – January 1977)
 Alan K. Campbell (February 1977 – April 1977)
 Elspeth Rostow (April 1977 – May 1983)
 Max Sherman (July 1983 – May 1997)
 Edwin Dorn (July 1997 – December 2004)
 Bobby Ray Inman (January 2005 – December 2005)
 James B. Steinberg (January 2006 – January 2009)
 Bobby Ray Inman (January 2009 – March 2010) 
 Robert Hutchings (March 2010 – September 2015)
 Angela Evans (January 2016 – 2020)
 J.R. DeShazo (September 2021 –)

Notable alumni

Stacey Abrams. M.P.Aff. 1998, Minority Leader of the Georgia House of Representatives; 2018 and 2022 Democratic Nominee for Governor of Georgia
Kenneth S. Apfel, M.P.Aff. 1978, Commissioner of the Social Security Administration from 1997 until his term ended in January 2001
Rodney Ellis, M.P.Aff. 1977, Texas State Senator.
Luis Espino, M.P.Aff. 2003, Speechwriter for Mexico's President Felipe Calderón
Ruth Hardy, M.P.Aff, 1996, member, Vermont Senate
Bill Owens, M.P.Aff. 1975, Governor of Colorado from 1999–2007
 Kathleen Merrigan, M.P.Aff 1987, Deputy Secretary, USDA
Sarah Eckhardt, M.P.Aff. 1998, Texas State Senator in the Texas Senate; former County Judge of Travis County.

See also
List of facilities named after Lyndon Johnson

References

External links 
LBJ School of Public Affairs
LBJ School Austin Alumni Association

1970 establishments in Texas
Educational institutions established in 1970
Public administration schools in the United States
Public policy schools
Schools of international relations in the United States
University of Texas at Austin schools, colleges, and departments